Hannu Kalevi Posti (15 January 1926 in Vehkalahti – 13 June 2012 in Helsinki) was a Finnish male long-distance runner and biathlete who competed in the 1952 Summer Olympics and in the 1964 Winter Olympics.

References

1926 births
2012 deaths
Finnish male long-distance runners
Finnish male biathletes
Olympic athletes of Finland
Olympic biathletes of Finland
Athletes (track and field) at the 1952 Summer Olympics
Biathletes at the 1964 Winter Olympics
Biathlon World Championships medalists